Cletis may refer to:
Cletis Carr (born 1959), U.S. musician
Cletis Gordon (born 1983), former American football player

See also
Who Is Cletis Tout?, 2001 American-Canadian action comedy film 
 Cletus (disambiguation)
 Cleitus (disambiguation)